The 2002 Swedish Golf Tour, known as the Telia Tour for sponsorship reasons, was the 17th season of the Swedish Golf Tour, a series of professional golf tournaments for women held in Sweden, Denmark and Finland.

Anna Becker won two events and Riikka Hakkarainen from Finland won the Order of Merit, the first non-Swedish season champion.

Schedule
The season consisted of 12 tournaments played between May and September, where one event was held in Finland and one in Denmark.

Order of Merit

Source:

See also
2002 Swedish Golf Tour (men's tour)

References

External links
Official homepage of the Swedish Golf Tour

Swedish Golf Tour (women)
Swedish Golf Tour (women)